USS Pocatello (PG-117/PF-9), a  patrol frigate, was the only ship of the United States Navy to be named for Pocatello, Idaho.

Construction and commissioning
Pocatello, originally classified as patrol gunboat, PG-117, was reclassified as a patrol frigate, PF-9, on 15 April 1943. She was laid down on 17 August 1943, under a Maritime Commission (MARCOM) contract, MC hull 1427, at the Permanente Metals Richmond Shipyard #4, Richmond, California. Pocatello was launched on 17 October 1943, sponsored by Miss Thelma Dixey, a great-granddaughter of Chief Pocatello; manned by a Coast Guard crew; and commissioned on 18 February 1944.

Service history
After fitting out at General Engineering and Drydock Company, in Alameda, California, and shakedown out of San Diego, through 28 April, Pocatello was assigned to Commander, Western Sea Frontier, and directed to commence weather station operations out of Seattle, Washington. Departing San Francisco, on 17 May, she arrived at Seattle, on 22 June. One month later she commenced her first patrol on Weather Station Able.

The actor Buddy Ebsen served aboard Pocatello. He applied for a commission in the US Navy but was turned down; even though he was teaching seamanship to Naval Reserve OCS candidate at the time. He then applied for and received a commission as a Lieutenant (junior grade) in the US Coast Guard. He was assigned to Pocatello and served on her from February 1944 until 16 October 1945.

Patrols consisted of thirty days at sea followed by ten days in port at Seattle. Pocatello alternated on station with the Coast Guard cutter , and had completed a dozen patrols by the war's end. Pocatello was then laid up on the west coast. Scheduled for disposal, she shifted to Charleston, South Carolina, arriving there on 6 April 1946, and decommissioning there on 2 May. Pocatello was subsequently sold at Charleston, in September 1947, to J. C. Berkwit and Company of New York City.

References

Bibliography

External links  
 
hazegray.org: USS Pocatello

Tacoma-class frigates
World War II patrol vessels of the United States
Ships built in Richmond, California
1943 ships
World War II frigates and destroyer escorts of the United States
Pocatello, Idaho